Oscar Giacché (14 August 1923 – 21 October 2005) was an Argentine cyclist. He competed at the 1948 and 1952 Summer Olympics.

References

1923 births
2005 deaths
Argentine male cyclists
Olympic cyclists of Argentina
Cyclists at the 1948 Summer Olympics
Cyclists at the 1952 Summer Olympics
Pan American Games medalists in cycling
Pan American Games gold medalists for Argentina
Cyclists at the 1951 Pan American Games
20th-century Argentine people